"Every Man" is a song by contemporary Christian and Christian rock band Casting Crowns from their 2007 album The Altar and the Door. It was released on April 13, 2008, as the second single of the album. The song peaked at No. 2 on the Hot Christian Songs chart. It lasted 22 weeks on the overall chart. The song is played in a C major key, and 144 beats per minute.

Background 
"Every Man" was released on April 13, 2008, as the second single from their third studio album The Altar and the Door. "Every Man" was also featured by the compilation WOW Hits 2009. The song is about showing that Jesus is everywhere and always wanting to help you.

Reception
Jared Johnson of Allmusic noted it had a "mature rock theme" and "showcased more grunge guitar than could be heard on all of Lifesong".

Track listing 
CD release
"Every Man (Demo) (Performance Track)" – 4:46 
"Every Man (With Background Vocals) (Performance Track)" – 4:46
"Every Man (High Without Background Vocals) (Performance Track)" – 4:46
"Every Man (Medium Without Background Vocals) (Performance Track)" – 4:46
"Every Man (Low Without Background Vocals) (Performance Track)" – 4:46

Charts

Weekly charts

Year-end charts

References

2007 singles
Casting Crowns songs
Songs written by Mark Hall (musician)
Songs written by Bernie Herms
2007 songs